Maurizio Galbaio (Latin: Mauricius Galba) (died 787) was the seventh traditional, but fifth historical, Doge of Venice from 764 to his death. He was the first great doge, who reigned for 22 years and set Venice on its path to independence and success.

History
Maurizio was raised to the dogeship at a time when two tribunes were being elected annually to check the power of the doge. His predecessor had been from a pro-Lombard faction, but Maurizio was a wealthy man from pro-Byzantine Heraclea. He opposed both the strong republican faction, which supported moving towards de facto independence, and the pro-Frankish and pro-Lombard factions. He received the titles of magister militum and hypatos from the Emperor Leo IV. 

The Lombard king Desiderius, in light of the alliance between the papacy and the Frankish king Charlemagne and the strong clerical support for Frankish hegemony in Venice, ravaged the states of the church and Istria, even capturing the doge's son Giovanni. Through the pope, Maurizio sent ambassadors to Charlemagne and his son was released. Maurizio then made the first of many subsequent attempts to create a hereditary dogeship when, in 778, he had his son made a second doge. Maurizio obtained the consent of the emperor of the East for this last act. 

During Maurizio's final eleven years, the Venetians expanded permanently to the Rialto islands. On the little island of Olivolo (now Castello), he reconsecrated the church of Saints Sergius and Bacchus as that of St Peter. It was raised to episcopal status and was the cathedral of Venice throughout the republican era. The low point of Maurizio's reign was the expulsion from the Pentapolis of Venetian traders for trading in slaves and eunuchs. 

Maurizio was succeeded by his son on his death. His name, Galbaio, came from his reputed descent from the ancient Roman emperor Galba.

Sources
Norwich, John Julius. A History of Venice. Alfred A. Knopf: New York, 1982.

References

797 deaths
8th-century Doges of Venice
Byzantine Empire–Republic of Venice relations
Year of birth unknown